Michael Austin may refer to:
Michael W. Austin, American philosopher
Michael Phillip Austin, Australian environmentalist
Michael Allen Austin (born 1965), American illustrator
Michael Austin (writer) (born 1966), American academic and critic of Mormon literature
Mick Austin, British artist
Michael Austin (politician) (1855–1916), Member of Parliament for West Limerick
Sir Michael Austin (1927–1995), 5th Baronet, of the Austin baronets
Michael Austin (singer)
Michael Austin (screenwriter), see Academy Award for Best Writing
Michael Austin (journalist) (born 1995), conservative columnist/reporter with The Western Journal

See also
Mike Austin (disambiguation)

Michael Austen (born 1964), South African cricketer